Most of the lakes of Korea are artificial reservoirs, due to the country's rugged topography.  Natural lakes include the crater lakes atop Baekdusan and Hallasan, the Upo wetland, and various lagoons along the coast of the Sea of Japan.

North Korea
 Heaven Lake
 Supung Lake
 Lake Changjin
 Lake Bujon
 Lake Rangrim
 Lake Samilpo

South Korea
 Anapji
 Andong Lake
 Chungju Lake
 Ilsan Lake
 Jinyang Lake
 Soyang Lake
 Uiam Lake
 Upo wetland

See also

 Korean peninsula
 Geography of North Korea
 Geography of South Korea

References
 

Korea
Lakes